Chris Burns (born 9 November 1967) is a former footballer.

Burns formerly played for UD Horadada, who compete in the Valencian Preferente in Spain, but in January 2009 left the club on mutual terms due to the economic down turn as the main board members, property developers Piensa, went into liquidation and forced Horadada to cut back dramatically.

Burns helped Portsmouth to the 1992 FA Cup semi final, but they lost on a penalty shootout to Liverpool.

Burns is currently manager of Hellenic League One West side Stonehouse Town. Burns is also signed on as a player for the Gloucestershire-based side.

In April 2014, Burns replaced John Brough as manager at Southern League side Bishop's Cleeve. However, he resigned from the role in June 2014. A month later he was named manager of Brockworth Albion.

In 2020, Burns was appointed manager of Stonehouse Town in the Hellenic League Division One West.

References

External links

1967 births
Living people
Footballers from Manchester
Association football midfielders
English footballers
Sharpness A.F.C. players
Cheltenham Town F.C. players
Portsmouth F.C. players
Swansea City A.F.C. players
AFC Bournemouth players
Northampton Town F.C. players
Gloucester City A.F.C. players
Forest Green Rovers F.C. players
Cinderford Town A.F.C. players
UD Horadada players
Cirencester Town F.C. players
English Football League players
English football managers
Gloucester City A.F.C. managers
Cinderford Town A.F.C. managers
Bishop's Cleeve F.C. managers
Cheltenham Town F.C. non-playing staff
English expatriate footballers